Coudoux is a commune in the Bouches-du-Rhône department in southern France.

Location

History
As early as the 16th century, there were two hamlets, "Petit Coudoux" (Small Coudoux) and "Grand Coudoux" (Big Coudoux). However, these were part of the commune of Ventabren and it was only in 1950 that Coudoux was made a commune in its own right.

Population

Town twinning

Since 2004 Coudoux is twinned with Baone, Province of Padua, Italy.

See also
Communes of the Bouches-du-Rhône department

References

External links
Official website

Communes of Bouches-du-Rhône
Bouches-du-Rhône communes articles needing translation from French Wikipedia